Hasanabad-e Tall Kamin (also Romanized as Ḩasanābād-e Tall Kamīn, Ḩasanābād-e Tol Kamīn, and Ḩasanābād Tol Kamīn; also known as Ḩoseynābād Kamīn) is a village in Naqsh-e Rostam Rural District, in the Central District of Marvdasht County, Fars Province, Iran. At the 2006 census, its population was 928, in 203 families.

References 

Populated places in Marvdasht County